Choe Sang-Hun (born 1962) is a Pulitzer Prize-winning South Korean journalist  and Seoul Bureau Chief for The New York Times.

Early life
Choe was born in Ulju County, Ulsan in southern South Korea. He received a B.A. in Economics from Yeungnam University and a master's degree in interpretation and translation from the Hankuk University of Foreign Studies in Seoul.

Career
Choe began his journalism career as a political reporter at The Korea Herald, an English-language daily. He joined the Associated Press's Seoul Bureau in 1994 and covered natural disasters, North Korea and 1997 Asian financial crisis. 

In 2000, he won the Pulitzer Prize in the Investigative Reporting along with Charles J. Hanley and Martha Mendoza for uncovering  the massacre of Korean civilians by U.S. soldiers at the No Gun Ri bridge during the Korean War. The series of investigative reports they produced on the No Gun Ri Massacre and similar incidents during the Korean War, published between September and December 1999, helped trigger broader private and government-sponsored investigations of wartime atrocities. He was the first Korean to receive a Pulitzer Prize. 

He joined The New York Times (then the International Herald Tribune) in 2005 as its Korea Correspondent. He covered Cyclone Nargis in Myanmar in 2008 with four other reporters from the International Herald Tribune, winning awards, including Asia Society’s Osborn Elliott Prize for Excellence in Journalism on Asia. In 2018, Choe was a member of the team of New York Times reporters who won the Overseas Press Club's Bob Considine Award for best newspaper, news service or digital interpretation of international affairs for its coverage of North Korea’s nuclear arsenal.

He was a 2010–2011 Koret Fellow in the Korean Studies Program at the Walter H. Shorenstein Asia-Pacific Research Center, part of Stanford University's Freeman Spogli Institute for International Studies.

Awards
1999 Worth Bingham Prize
1999 Overseas Press Club's Madeline Dane Ross Award
2000 Pulitzer Prize for Investigative Reporting
2000 George Polk Awards
2000 International Consortium of Investigative Journalists Award
2000 Johns Hopkins University SAIS-Novartis International Journalism Award
2007 Human Rights Press Awards 
2009 Asia Society’s Osborn Elliott Prize for Excellence in Journalism
2018 Overseas Press Club's Bob Considine Award

Works

References

External links
Home page at the Freeman Spogli Institute for International Studies
Author index at The New York Times

1962 births
Living people
Associated Press reporters
People from Ulsan
Pulitzer Prize for Investigative Reporting winners
South Korean journalists
The New York Times writers